Nathusius is a surname. Notable people with the surname include:

Annemarie von Nathusius (1874–1926), German novelist
Elsbeth von Nathusius (1846–1928), German novelist
Hermann von Nathusius (1809–1879),  German animal breeder
Johann Gottlob Nathusius (1760–1835), German industrialist
Johanne Philippine Nathusius (1828–1885), German religious philanthropist
Marie Nathusius (1817–1857), German novelist
Martin von Nathusius (1843–1906), German theologian
Philipp von Nathusius (publisher) (1815–1872), German publisher
Susanne von Nathusius (1850–1929), German portrait painter
Suzanna von Nathusius, Polish child film actor
Thomas von Nathusius (1866–1904), German landscape and animal painter
Wilhelm von Nathusius (1821–1899), German biologist 
Wilhelm von Nathusius (officer) (1856–1937), German Major General

See also
Nathusius Investments, Polish publisher
Nathusius's Pipistrelle, bat in the pipistrelle genus